{{Infobox government cabinet
|cabinet_name = 9th Canadian Ministry9e conseil des ministres du Canada
|cabinet_type= ministry
|cabinet_number = 9th
|jurisdiction = Canada
|flag = Canadian Red Ensign 1868-1921.svg
|flag_border = true
|image = Borden-sm.jpg
|date_formed = 10 October 1911
|date_dissolved= 11 October 1917
|government_head_title = Prime Minister
|government_head = Robert Borden
|government_head_history =
|state_head_title = Monarch
|state_head = George V
|represented_by_title = Governor General
|represented_by = Earl GreyDuke of ConnaughtDuke of Devonshire
|total_number=
|political_party = Conservative Party (historical)
|legislature_status = <small>Majority</small>
|opposition_party = Liberal Party of Canada
|opposition_leader = Wilfrid Laurier
|election = 1911
|legislature_term = 12th Canadian Parliament
|budget = 
|previous = 8th Canadian Ministry
|successor = 10th Canadian Ministry
}}
The Ninth Canadian Ministry was the first cabinet chaired by Prime Minister Sir Robert Borden.  It governed Canada from 10 October 1911 to 12 October 1917, including only the 12th Canadian Parliament.  The government was formed by the old Conservative Party of Canada.  The Conservatives governed in coalition with the Liberal-Conservative Party until 12 October 1916 when the last Liberal-Conservative cabinet minister, Sam Hughes, was dismissed.  Borden was also Prime Minister in the Tenth Canadian Ministry, which he formed for the coalition government with the Liberal–Unionists.

 Cabinet
Prime Minister
10 October 1911 – 12 October 1917: Sir Robert Borden
Minister of Agriculture 
10 October 1911 – 16 October 1911: Vacant (George Finley O'Halloran was acting)
16 October 1911 – 12 October 1917: Martin Burrell
Minister of Aviation
31 October 1916 – 12 October 1917: Sir George Halsey Perley
Minister of Customs
10 October 1911 – 12 October 1917: John Dowsley Reid
Secretary of State for External Affairs
10 October 1911 – 1 April 1912: William James Roche
1 April 1912 – 12 October 1917: Sir Robert Borden
Minister of Finance
10 October 1911 – 12 October 1917: Sir William Thomas White
Receiver General of Canada
10 October 1911 – 12 October 1917: The Minister of Finance (Ex officio)
10 October 1911 – 12 October 1917: Sir William Thomas White
Superintendent-General of Indian Affairs
10 October 1911 – 12 October 1917: The Minister of the Interior (Ex officio)
10 October 1911 – 29 October 1912: Robert Rogers
29 October 1912 – 12 October 1917: William James Roche
Minister of Inland Revenue 
10 October 1911 – 20 October 1914: Wilfrid Bruno Nantel
20 October 1914 – 6 October 1915: Pierre-Édouard Blondin
6 October 1915 – 8 January 1917: Esioff-Léon Patenaude
8 January 1917 – 12 October 1917: Albert Sévigny
Minister of the Interior
10 October 1911 – 29 October 1912: Robert Rogers
29 October 1912 – 12 October 1917: William James Roche
Minister of Justice
10 October 1911 – 12 October 1917: Charles Doherty
Attorney General of Canada
10 October 1911 – 12 October 1917: The Minister of Justice (Ex officio)
10 October 1911 – 12 October 1917: Charles Doherty
Minister of Labour 
10 October 1911 – 12 October 1917: Thomas Wilson Crothers
Leader of the Government in the Senate
10 October 1911 – 12 October 1917: Sir James Alexander Lougheed
Minister of Marine and Fisheries
10 October 1911 – 12 October 1917: John Douglas Hazen
Minister of Militia and Defence 
10 October 1911 – 12 October 1916: Sir Samuel Hughes
12 October 1916 – 23 November 1916: Vacant (Eugène Fiset was acting)
23 November 1916 – 12 October 1917: Sir Albert Edward Kemp
Minister of Mines
10 October 1911 – 30 March 1912: Wilfrid Bruno Nantel
30 March 1912 – 29 October 1912: Robert Rogers
29 October 1912 – 10 February 1913: William James Roche 
10 February 1913 – 6 October 1915: Louis Coderre
6 October 1915 – 8 January 1917: Pierre-Édouard Blondin
8 January 1917 – 13 June 1917: Esioff-Léon Patenaude
13 June 1917 – 25 August 1917: Albert Sévigny (acting)
 25 August 1917 – 12 October 1917: Arthur Meighen
Minister of the Naval Service 
10 October 1911 – 12 October 1917: John Douglas Hazen
Minister of Overseas Military Forces
31 October 1916 – 12 October 1917: Sir George Halsey Perley
Postmaster General
10 October 1911 – 20 October 1914: Louis-Philippe Pelletier
20 October 1914 – 30 December 1916: Thomas Chase-Casgrain
30 December 1916 – 8 January 1917: Vacant ( Robert Miller Coulter was acting)
8 January 1917 – 12 October 1917: Pierre-Édouard Blondin
President of the Privy Council
10 October 1911 – 12 October 1917: Sir Robert Borden
Minister of Public Works
10 October 1911 – 29 October 1912: Frederick Debartzch Monk
29 October 1912 – 23 August 1917: Robert Rogers
23 August 1917 – 3 October 1917: Vacant (James Blake Hunter was acting)
3 October 1917 – 12 October 1917: Charles Ballantyne
Minister of Railways and Canals 
10 October 1911 – 12 October 1917: Francis Cochrane
Secretary of State of Canada
10 October 1911 – 29 October 1912: William James Roche
29 October 1912 – 6 October 1915: Louis Coderre
6 October 1915 – 8 January 1917: Pierre-Édouard Blondin
8 January 1917 – 13 June 1917: Esioff-Léon Patenaude
13 June 1917 – 25 August 1917: Albert Sévigny (acting)
25 August 1917 – 12 October 1917: Arthur Meighen 
Registrar General of Canada
10 October 1911 – 12 October 1917: The Secretary of State of Canada (Ex officio)
10 October 1911 – 29 October 1912: William James Roche
29 October 1912 – 6 October 1915: Louis Coderre
6 October 1915 – 8 January 1917: Pierre-Édouard Blondin
8 January 1917 – 13 June 1917: Esioff-Léon Patenaude
13 June 1917 – 25 August 1917: Albert Sévigny (acting)
25 August 1917 – 12 October 1917: Arthur Meighen
Solicitor General of Canada
2 October 1915 – 25 August 1917: Arthur Meighen
25 August 1917 – 31 August 1917: Vacant
31 August 1917 – 12 October 1917: Arthur Meighen (acting)
Minister of Trade and Commerce
10 October 1911 – 12 October 1917: Sir George Eulas Foster
Minister without Portfolio 
10 October 1911 – 31 October 1916: Sir George Halsey Perley
10 October 1911 – 23 November 1916: Sir Albert Edward Kemp
10 October 1911 – 12 October 1917: Sir James Alexander Lougheed

Offices not of the CabinetParliamentary Undersecretary of State for External Affairs15 July 1916 – 21 October 1916: Vacant
21 October 1916 – 12 October 1917: Hugh ClarkParliamentary Secretary of Militia and Defence15 July 1916 – 19 July 1916: Vacant
19 July 1916 – 12 October 1917: Fleming Blanchard McCurdySolicitor General of Canada'''
10 October 1911 – 26 June 1913: Vacant
26 June 1913 – 2 October 1915: Arthur Meighen
4 October 1917 – 12 October 1917: Hugh Guthrie

References

Succession

09
1911 establishments in Canada
1917 disestablishments in Canada
Cabinets established in 1911
Cabinets disestablished in 1917
Ministries of George V